A Paris–Brest is a French dessert made of choux pastry and a praline flavoured cream.

History 
The round pastry, in the form of a wheel, was created in 1910 by Louis Durand, pâtissier of Maisons-Laffitte, at the request of Pierre Giffard, to commemorate the Paris–Brest–Paris bicycle race he had initiated in 1891. Its circular shape is representative of a wheel. It became popular with riders on the Paris–Brest–Paris cycle race, partly because of its energizing, high-calorie value and its intriguing name, and is now found in pâtisseries all over France.

See also
 List of choux pastry dishes

References

External links 

Food and drink introduced in 1910
French pastries
Choux pastry